Gascar is a French surname. Notable people with the surname include:

 Henri Gascar (1635–1701), French painter
 Pierre Gascar (1916–1997), French author

French-language surnames